Sold at Hungry Jack's fast food restaurants, a Storm is a flavoured ice cream dessert similar to McDonald's McFlurry ice cream. The product consists of vanilla flavoured soft serve ice cream served with either one of three flavours; Cookies & Cream (Oreo), Flake or Rainbow (Sprinkles). The selected flavour is then whipped together with the ice cream using a blender.The tent to be very unhealthy

External links 
 

Ice cream brands